On 14 March 1972, Sterling Airways Flight 296 crashed into a mountain ridge on approach to Dubai near Kalba, United Arab Emirates. Flight 296 was a charter flight from Colombo to Copenhagen with stops in Bombay, Dubai, and Ankara. All 112 passengers and crew on board died in the crash which was attributed to pilot error. The flight was operated by a Sud Aviation Caravelle, registration OY-STL. To date, it is the deadliest air disaster to involve a Caravelle and the deadliest air disaster in the history of the United Arab Emirates along with Gulf Air Flight 771.

Aircraft 

The aircraft involved was Sud Aviation SE-210 Caravelle 10B3 (serial number 267) that was built in May 1970 and had its maiden flight on 10 May the same year. The aircraft was delivered to Sterling Airways on May 19 and subsequently received its airworthiness certificate and registration OY-STL on 22 May. OY-STL was in a long-haul flight configuration being equipped with central fuel tanks. The aircraft was powered by two Pratt & Whitney JT8D-9 engines. The passenger capacity of the cabin was 109 seats, though the maximum number of people on board was 116. The aircraft had 6,674 hours and 50 minutes flight time and 2,373 landings at the time of the accident. The last Y-l check (every 12–15 months) was performed by Finnair (under a contract) on 5 June 1971. The aircraft's last overhaul was performed on 8 February 1972, when the aircraft had 6,270 hours 39 minutes of flying time. The last A and B technical inspections were performed one day before the accident flight on 13 March 1972, before departure from Copenhagen. The last B-check was performed in Bombay the same day.

Flight 
Sterling Airways Flight 296 was chartered by the tour company Tjaereborg Rejser to take 106 Europeans home from vacations in Ceylon (present day Sri Lanka). The flight from Colombo to Copenhagen was scheduled to make refuelling stops in Bombay, Dubai, and Ankara. A change of crew was also scheduled during the stop in Ankara. Flight 296 departed from Colombo on time at 17:20 local time for Bombay.

The 106 passengers were from Denmark, Finland, Norway, Sweden, and West Germany. The Danish cockpit crew consisted of Captain Ole Jorgensen, 35 and First Officer Jorgen Pedersen, 30.

At 19:45, it landed in Bombay. The passengers were not allowed to de-plane during the stop in Bombay. After refuelling Flight 296 departed Bombay for the next stop in Dubai at 21:20.

According to the flight plan, Flight 296 from Bombay to Dubai was to follow the R19 air corridor at flight level 310 (. The length of the route was  the majority of it passing over the Arabian Sea, while the route had 5 waypoints for reports on position: SALMON, SEAHORSE, BLUE WHALE, DOLPHIN and SPEARFISH, located 292, 531, 706 and 854 miles (185, 541, 983, 1308 and 1582 km) respectively, from Bombay.

At 21:40, the crew of Flight 296 informed the Bombay approach controller that they were passing the SALMON waypoint and that they were climbing from flight level 250 (7.62 km), to 310. At 21:49 the controller reported the flight reaching FL 310. At 21:14 the crew reported passing the SEAHORSE waypoint. At 21:52, the Bombay controller instructed the crew to change frequencies. Beginning at 21:47 the controllers experienced communication problems with Flight 296, but managed to re-establish communication at 22:04. Flight 296 passed the BLUE WHALE waypoint at 22:49 which was 3 to 6 minutes earlier than expected.

Flight 296 reported passing the DOLPHIN point at 22:14 via a relay — a minute earlier than planned at Blue Whale, and already 10 minutes earlier than planned when departing from Bombay. At 21:25 pm, the crew contacted the tower of the Dubai Airport and received information about the weather in Dubai. At 21:42 at a frequency of 124.9 MHz, flight 296 contacted the control center in Dubai and reported on the passage of the SPEARFISH waypoint at 21:42 at flight level 310, and the estimated landing time in Dubai is 22:10. At the same time, Flight 296 was instructed to go under the control of the Dubai-approach. The crew received information that the bearing on them from the D0 radio beacon (Dubai VOR) is 084, and the descent from FL 310 would begin at 21:55. However at 21:49,  from the airport, the crew requested to descend early. The approach controller cleared Flight 296 to descend to FL 40 (4000 feet or 1219 meters). Then the control center asked the crew if they wanted a heading of 084, to which the crew accepted. The controller then gave instructions regarding the heading. Shortly before 22:00 local time, Flight 296 began the approach into Dubai.

Accident 
The weather in Dubai was cloudy with scattered thunderstorms. The crews of other aircraft reported an overcast sky with the formation of large cumulus clouds over the coast. The crew of BOAC Flight 833 (also flying to Dubai, though departing from Calcutta) indicated that the coast was poorly visible on meteorological radar due to thunderstorms, although the crew of SABENA Flight 352 (which also departed Bombay but was bound for Athens), on the contrary, reported a clear sky.

At 21:50, the crew of Flight 296 reported descending from 310 to 40 and asked which runway to take. The controller responded that the wind was at 045/6 knots and that the landing could be carried out on either runway 30 or 12. The crew selected runway 30. At 21:56, The crew reported leaving flight level 135 and the controller instructed the flight to maintain  relative to the level of Dubai Airport (1016 hPa) with a report on occupying a height of 2000 and observing the airfield. The crew acknowledged the transmission.

For better communication, the crew switched to the backup radio, but since it was quiet, the radio communications on the cockpit voice recorder were in poor condition or unusable. At 22:01, Flight 296 contacted the controller, but this was not recorded on the CVR. According to the controller's testimony, when the crew asked how the airport’s driving station worked, the controller replied, "it functions normally." The dispatcher also warned: "the ADF radio station antenna was reduced in length due to the runway extension, and 'DO' is not giving much power. Use the VOR at 115.7 [MHz] or the ILS localizer at 110.1 [MHz]."

Just after this transmission, the crew transmitted another message. At 22:02:04 the controller made the following response: "296, Dubai,you are fading away say again please." And at 22:02:12 said, "296, Dubai, QNH Dubai 1016.5." Transmissions from flight 296 were not recorded by the CVR. At 22:03:15, the controller transmitted: "296, Dubai, next report field in sight", but the controller believed Flight 296 did not hear his message. At 22:04, the crew radioed that the VOR was not properly working, to which the controller transmitted at 18:03:42: "296, Dubai, if the VOR indication are not reliable, select ILS on and tune [at a] frequency of 110.1. The QDM is 300°, this will align you with the runway."

In the impact the left wing broke off. The plane continued another  meters before impacting below the top of the next ridge. The wreckage slid down the slope and ended up in five different valleys.

Local residents stated that it was raining at the time. Several residents of Kalba were digging a ditch around a hut to divert rainwater, when at 22:00 local time an aircraft flew over the city at a low altitude. One of the residents stated that the aircraft flew so low that its navigation lights were clearly visible. An explosion was seen shortly after. The residents got into a Land Rover vehicle and tried to get to the crash site, but the vehicle was stuck in the mud. The residents of the nearby Al-Heilruen settlement heard the explosion but thought that it was thunder.

At 22:10, dispatchers in Dubai informed Bahrain about the loss of communication with Flight 296. All attempts to contact the plane were unsuccessful, and an emergency was declared at 22:40 and a search began.

Cause 
The investigation found that the pilots descended below the minimum prescribed altitude. This was due to incorrect information on the outdated flight plan and/or due to a misreading of the weather radar which led the pilots to believe they were closer to Dubai than they actually were.

Nationalities of the passengers and crew 

Sources:

References

External links 

 Government of Denmark, Luftfartsdirektoratet.
 Final accident report( )
Final accident report - English translation
 The worst air disaster in the history of the United Arab Emirates (Danish).

Aviation accidents and incidents in 1972
Aviation accidents and incidents in the United Arab Emirates
Airliner accidents and incidents involving controlled flight into terrain
Airliner accidents and incidents caused by pilot error
Accidents and incidents involving the Sud Aviation Caravelle
Sterling Airlines accidents and incidents
March 1972 events in Asia
Pages with unreviewed translations
1972 disasters in the United Arab Emirates